Kano Ikeda (1887–1960), was a Japanese American professor of pathology who wrote several articles relating to his experience of the 1924–1925 Minnesota smallpox epidemic. Ikeda's 1925 report on laboratory findings in haemorrhage smallpox were used by Derrick Tovey to diagnose early cases of smallpox during the Bradford smallpox outbreak of 1962.

Ikeda was a native of Tokyo, Japan, and came to the United States in 1904. In 1953, he was the first person from Japan to become a U.S. citizen in Minnesota. He worked at Miller Hospital in St. Paul and at the University of Minnesota.

Selected publications

References

1887 births
1960 deaths
American pathologists
Japanese emigrants to the United States
American academics of Japanese descent